The 1998–99 Argentine Torneo Argentino A was the fourth season of third division professional football in Argentina. A total of 14 teams competed; the champions were promoted to Primera B Nacional.

Club information

Zone A

Zone B

Teams from Argentino B that played the Final Stage

First stage

Zone A

Zone B

Final stage

Zone A

Zone B

Relegation Playoffs

Semifinals

San Martín (MC) was relegated to 1999–00 Torneo Argentino B.

Argentinos del Norte abandoned the Competition.

Final

13 de Junio (P) was promoted to 1999–00 Torneo Argentino A by winning the playoff and Central Córdoba (SdE) was relegated to 1999–00 Torneo Argentino B.

See also
1998–99 in Argentine football

References

Torneo Argentino A seasons
3